Thomas James Welland (31 March 1830 – 29 July 1907) was an Irish Anglican bishop.

Welland was born in county Dublin (his father Joseph being an architect) and was educated at Trinity College, Dublin (BA mathematics 1854, MA 1857, BD & DD 1890) and ordained in 1854. He began his ordained ministry as a curate at Carlow, after which he was vicar of Painstown and then assistant chaplain of the Mariners’ Church in Kingstown. He was the clerical secretary of the Jews’ Society, Ireland from 1862 to 1866 and then assistant chaplain at Christ Church, Dublin until 1870.  He then became the incumbent at St Thomas’s Belfast from 1870 until his ordination to the episcopate as the Bishop of Down, Connor and Dromore in 1892. He died in post on 29 July 1907.

References

1830 births
Christian clergy from Dublin (city)
Alumni of Trinity College Dublin
19th-century Anglican bishops in Ireland
20th-century Anglican bishops in Ireland
Bishops of Down, Connor and Dromore
1907 deaths